The following tunnels are named the Broadway Tunnel:
Broadway Tunnel (San Francisco) through Russian Hill
"Broadway Low-level Tunnel" through the Berkeley Hills, now known as the Caldecott Tunnel
Broadway Tunnel (Los Angeles), a former tunnel under Fort Moore Hill
Broadway Line (disambiguation), several subway tunnels in New York City